Bolje ti is the fourth studio album by the Serbian rock band Bjesovi, released in 2009.

The album

Track listing 
 "Ako te neko zna" (2:47) (Zoran Marinković, Zoran Niketić, Dragan Arsić)
 "Besan pas" (2:06) (Zoran Marinković)
 "Kad se ruke moje vezane razdvoje" (3:56) (Zoran Marinković, Dragan Arsić)
 "Istina" (3:18) (Zoran Marinković)
 "Ko te vide taj se seća" (4:11) (Zoran Marinković, Goran Ugarčina)
 "Izdaja" (3:56) (Zoran Marinković, Dragan Arsić)
 "Hvala što postojiš" (3:49) (Zoran Marinković, Goran Ugarčina, Dragan Arsić)
 "Laku noć" (5:10) (Zoran Marinković, Dragan Arsić)
 "Bolje ti" (4:40) (Zoran Marinković)

The DVD

Track listing 
Scripted, directed and edited by Zoran Marinković, except for "Ako te neko zna" which was directed and edited by Marinković and Goran Ugarčina.
 "Ako te neko zna"
 "Besan pas"
 "Kad se ruke moje vezane razdvoje"
 "Istina"
 "Bolje ti (version 2)"
 "Ko te vide taj se seća"
 "Izdaja" (3:56)
 "Hvala što postojiš"
 "Laku noć"
 "Bolje ti (version 1)"

Personnel 
 Marko Marković (bass)
 Miroslav Marjanović (drums)
 Dragan Arsić (guitar)
 Slobodan Vuković (guitar)
 Zoran Marinković (vocals)

External links 
 Bolje ti at Discogs

Bjesovi albums
2009 albums
PGP-RTS albums